Vladimír Hyka (born 29 May 1952) is a Czech sports shooter. He competed in the men's 25 metre rapid fire pistol event at the 1976 Summer Olympics.

References

External links
 

1952 births
Living people
Czech male sport shooters
Olympic shooters of Czechoslovakia
Shooters at the 1976 Summer Olympics
People from Česká Lípa
Sportspeople from the Liberec Region